Scopula urnaria is a moth of the  family Geometridae. It is found on Peninsular Malaysia, Borneo and Palawan. The habitat consists of lowland dipterocarp forests.

References

Moths described in 1858
urnaria
Moths of Asia